Hüseyin Baybaşin (born 25 December 1956) is a Kurdish drug trafficker. He is currently serving life sentence in the Netherlands convicted of murder, drug smuggling and other charges.

Rise to leadership of a drug empire 

In 1976, he was apprehended with  hashish found in his house by a raid, and was charged with two years in prison. Later, Hüseyin was arrested in the United Kingdom for possession of fake passport, and sentenced to twelve years. However, he was released after around four years to serve the rest in Turkey. After four months of incarceration in Turkey, he was set free in 1989. Only four days from his release from the prison, he was apprehended in Silivri, a town west of Istanbul, for carrying an unlicensed gun and narcotics. Hüseyin fled abroad but was arrested by the Dutch police in 1995 and served a sentence.

By 1998, the Baybaşins were making millions from exporting heroin to Europe. His elder brother Abdullah Baybaşin, also a drug lord, immigrated to the United Kingdom and set up his business in North London, while Hüseyin chose the Dutch metropole Amsterdam for his base.

Some sources described Huseyin as "Europe's Pablo Escobar".

Life sentence 
On 27 March 1998 Hüseyin was arrested in a villa in Lieshout along with his nephew Gıyasettin Baybaşin following a joint operation carried out by the British, Italian, Belgian, German and Dutch police. He was initially placed in an ordinary detention facility in Rotterdam. On 26 June 1998 it was decided to detain him in a pre-trial detention unit of maximum security in Vught. His incarceration in the Vught Prison was extended several times.

Hüseyin Baybaşin and Gıyasettin were tried and found guilty on 10 February 2001 on charges of conspiracy to murder, kidnapping and drug smuggling. Ton Derksen, a Dutch professor emeritus, got access to the telephone recordings which were presented as evidence. According to him, the telephone recordings were manipulated. Hüseyin was convicted and sentenced to twenty years in prison, increased to a life sentence in July 2002, while Gıyasettin received a sentence of eleven years in prison. Abdullah Baybaşin was also convicted in 2002 and jailed in the United Kingdom.

On 24 December 2003 Hüseyin Baybaşin was transferred to another prison with a different regime. On 23 March 2004 a psychiatric report found that Baybaşin had developed various mental problems including chronic post-traumatic stress disorder, depression and a strong tendency towards somatisation during his detention in the maximum security prison.

In the same period, the State Security Court (DGM) in Istanbul tried 21 Turkish people, among them in absentia Hüseyin and Gıyasettin Baybaşın, imprisoned in the Netherlands, and Nizamettin Baybaşin, convicted for fifteen years in prison in Germany, for setting up a criminal organization and exporting illicit drugs. The court concluded the apprehension of those accused.

Hüseyin is believed to have retained most of his vast wealth, which he invested in tourist resorts along the Mediterranean and Aegean coasts.

Kısmetim-1 incident 

The ocean freighter MV Kısmetim-1 was intercepted end of 1992 by the Turkish police in Mediterranean, suspected of smuggling about  morphine base, worth millions of dollars. The ship was scuttled by the crew during the operation. It was claimed that the drug belonged to a consortium of the ship's owner Osman Ayanoğlu and his partners including Şeyhmus Daş and Hüseyin Baybaşin.

References 

1956 births
Living people
People from Lice, Turkey
Turkish people of Kurdish descent
Turkish drug traffickers
Prisoners sentenced to life imprisonment by the Netherlands
Turkish crime bosses
Kurdish criminals